GNOME Evolution (formerly Novell Evolution and Ximian Evolution, prior to Novell's 2003 acquisition of Ximian) is the official personal information manager for GNOME. It has been an official part of GNOME since Evolution 2.0 was included with the GNOME 2.8 release in September 2004. It combines e-mail, address book, calendar, task list and note-taking features. Its user interface and functionality is similar to Microsoft Outlook. Evolution is free software licensed under the terms of the GNU Lesser General Public License (LGPL).

Features

Evolution delivers the following features:
 E-mail retrieval with the POP and IMAP protocols and e-mail transmission with SMTP
 Secure network connections encrypted with SSL, TLS and STARTTLS
 E-mail encryption with GPG and S/MIME
 Markdown e-mail formatting
 E-mail filters
 Search folders: saved searches that look like normal mail folders as an alternative to using filters and search queries
 Automatic spam filtering with SpamAssassin and Bogofilter
 Connectivity to Microsoft Exchange Server, Novell GroupWise and Kolab (provided in separate packages as plug-ins)
 Calendar support for the iCalendar file format, the WebDAV and CalDAV standards and Google Calendar
 Contact management with local address books, CardDAV, LDAP and Google address books
 Synchronization via SyncML with SyncEvolution and with Palm OS devices via gnome-pilot
 Address books that can be used as a data source in LibreOffice
 User avatars loading from address book, e-mail headers X-Face, Face or automatic lookup by hashed e-mail address from Gravatar service
 An RSS reader plug-in
 A news client
 Import from Microsoft Outlook archives (dbx, pst) and Berkley Mailbox

The Novell GroupWise plug-in is no longer in active development. A Scalix plug-in is also available, but its development stopped in 2009.

Evolution Data Server 
Evolution Data Server (EDS) is a collection of libraries and session services for storing address books and calendars. Other software such as California and GNOME Calendar depends on EDS as well.

Some documentation about the software architecture is available in the GNOME wiki.

Connecting to Microsoft Exchange Server
Depending on which version of Microsoft Exchange Server is used, different packages need to be installed to be able to connect to it. The documentation recommends the evolution-ews package (which uses Exchange Web Services) for Exchange Server 2007, 2010 and newer. If evolution-ews does not work well, it is advised to try the evolution-mapi package. This supports Exchange Server 2010, 2007 and possibly older versions supporting MAPI. For Exchange Server 2003, 2000 and possibly earlier versions supporting Outlook Web App the package evolution-exchange is recommended.

History
Ximian decided to develop Evolution in 2000. It felt there were no e-mail clients for Linux at the time that could provide the functionality and interoperability necessary for corporate users. Ximian saw an opportunity for Linux to penetrate the corporate environment if the right enterprise software was available for it. It released Evolution 1.0 in December 2001 and offered the paid Ximian Connector plug-in which allowed users to connect with Microsoft Exchange Server. Evolution itself has been free software from the start, but Ximian Connector was sold as proprietary software so that Ximian could generate revenue. This changed after Novell's acquisition of Ximian in August 2003. Novell decided to integrate the Exchange plug-in as free software in Evolution 2.0 in May 2004.

Novell was in turn acquired by The Attachmate Group in 2011. It transferred Novell's former Evolution developers to its subsidiary SUSE. In 2012 SUSE decided to stop its funding of Evolution's development and assigned its developers elsewhere. As a consequence only two full-time developers employed by Red Hat remained. Later in 2013 Red Hat dedicated more developers to the project, reinvigorating its development. The reasons given for the decision were the cessation of active development on Mozilla Thunderbird and the need for an e-mail client with good support for Microsoft Exchange.

Distribution
As a part of GNOME, Evolution is released as source code. Linux distributions provide packages of GNOME for end-users. Evolution is used as the default personal information manager on several Linux distributions which use GNOME by default, most notably Debian and Fedora. Ubuntu has replaced Evolution with Mozilla Thunderbird as the default e-mail client since Ubuntu 11.10 Oneiric Ocelot.

Defunct Mac OS X and Windows ports
In the past, Evolution was ported to Apple Mac OS X and Microsoft Windows, but these ports are no longer developed.

In 2006, Novell released an installer for Evolution 2.6 on Mac OS X. In January 2005, Novell's Nat Friedman announced in his blog that the company had hired Tor Lillqvist, the programmer who ported GIMP to Microsoft Windows, to do the same with Evolution.  Prior to this announcement, several projects with the same goal had been started but none of them reached alpha status. In 2008 DIP Consultants released a Windows installer for Evolution 2.28.1-1 for Microsoft Windows XP and newer. Currently it is only available for download from the project's page on SourceForge.

A slightly more recent (2010/2011) experimental installer for Evolution 3.0.2 is provided by openSUSE. Users have faced difficulties getting this version working.

See also

 Geary – another email client for GNOME
 List of personal information managers
 Comparison of email clients

Notes

References

External links

Email client software for Linux
Email clients that use GTK
Free calendaring software
Free email software
Free personal information managers
Free software programmed in C
Office software that uses GTK